The 1970 All-Atlantic Coast Conference football team consists of American football players chosen by various selectors for their All-Atlantic Coast Conference ("ACC") teams for the 1970 NCAA University Division football season. Selectors in 1970 included the Associated Press (AP).

All-Atlantic Coast Conference selections

Offensive selections

Ends
 Wes Chesson, Duke (AP)
 Jim Mitchell, South Carolina (AP)

Offensive tackles
 Paul Hoolahan, North Carolina (AP)
 Dave DeCamilla, South Carolina (AP)

Offensive guards
 Dave Thompson, Clemson (AP)
 Bill Bobbora, Wake Forest (AP)

Centers
 Dan Ryczek, Virginia (AP)

Backs
 Don McCauley, North Carolina (AP)
 Leo Hart, Duke (AP)
 Larry Hopkins, Wake Forest (AP)
 Larry Russell, Wake Forest (AP)

Defensive selections

Defensive ends
 Guy Roberts, Maryland (AP)
 Bruce Mills, Duke (AP)

Defensive tackles
 Win Headley, Wake Forest (AP)
 Flip Ray, North Carolina (AP)

Linebackers
 Dick Biddle, Duke (AP)
 George Smith, NC State (AP)
 Ed Stetz, Wake Forest (AP)

Defensive backs
 Dick Harris, South Carolina (AP)
 Jack Whitley, NC State (AP)
 Rick Searl, Duke (AP)
 Don Kelley, Clemson (AP)

Special teams

Kickers
 Tracy Lounsbury, Wake Forest (AP)

Key
AP = Associated Press

See also
1970 College Football All-America Team

References

All-Atlantic Coast Conference football team
All-Atlantic Coast Conference football teams